Elizabeth Cromwell may refer to:

Close relations of Oliver Cromwell

 Elizabeth Cromwell [''née Stewart] (–1654), mother of Oliver Cromwell
 Elizabeth Cromwell [née Bourchier] (1598–1665), Lady Protectress, wife of Oliver Cromwell
 Elizabeth Claypole (1629–1658), second and favourite daughter of Oliver Cromwell
 Elizabeth Cromwell, (née Russell) (–1687) wife of Henry Cromwell
 Elizabeth Cromwell, (1650–) daughter of Richard Cromwell
Elizabeth Wyckes (d. 1529), wife of Thomas Cromwell, 1st Earl of Essex
See also
 Elizabeth Cromwell (activist) (1944–2019), African Nova Scotian and Black Loyalist
 Elizabeth Seymour, Lady Cromwell (c. 1518–1568), married Gregory Cromwell, son of Thomas Cromwell, 1st Earl of Essex and was the sister of Jane Seymour, third wife of Henry VIII.